Tomorrow When the War Began is an Australian drama television series based on the Tomorrow series by John Marsden, produced by Michael Boughen and Tony Winley and executive produced by Matthew Street and Kim Vecera. The series, which consisted of six one-hour episodes, premiered on ABC3 on 23 April 2016, and covered roughly the events of the first novel, Tomorrow, When the War Began.

Premise
Based on the award-winning novels written by John Marsden, Tomorrow When the War Began follows a group of eight teenage friends who find themselves in the middle of an unexpected war in a small country town after returning from a remote camping trip. Cut off from the rest of the world and everyone they knew, they must find their way in the new world, where they are among only a few remaining free Australians, who must learn to defend themselves against the hostile invaders and save their detained families.

Cast

Main
 Molly Daniels as Eleanor "Ellie" Linton
 Narek Arman as Homer Yannos
 Jon Prasida as Lee Takkam
 Madeleine Clunies-Ross as Fiona "Fi" Maxwell
 Madeleine Madden as Corrie Mackenzie
 Andrew Creer as Kevin Holmes
 Fantine Banulski as Robyn Mathers
 Keith Purcell as Chris Maxwell

Recurring
 Sibylla Budd as Rachel Maxwell
 Deborah Mailman as Kath Mackenzie
 Alison Bell as Liz Linton
 Richard Young as Jack Linton
 Spencer McLaren as Daniel Maxwell
 Damien Fotiou as George Yannos
 Alfred Nicdao as Umar Takkam
 James Stewart as Colonel Lee

Episodes

Production

Filming
The series was shot from 14 September to 13 November 2015. Filming took place in and around Melbourne, on the Barwon Heads Bridge, and in Clunes, Victoria.

Promotion
On 27 November 2015, ABC released its official line-up of new television series to be broadcast in 2016, which included a short preview for Tomorrow When the War Began. On 1 January 2016, the first full trailer was released for the series. Further teasers and trailers were released in March 2016.

Broadcast
Tomorrow When the War Began is broadcast on ABC3 and distributed in Australia by ABC Commercial. The series was distributed internationally by Annapurna Pictures.

Ratings

Home media release 
Tomorrow When the War Began was released on DVD and Blu-Ray on 1 June 2016 in Region 4/B.

See also
 Tomorrow, When the War Began, the first book in the Tomorrow series
 Tomorrow, When the War Began (film)

References

External links
 
 

2016 Australian television series debuts
2016 Australian television series endings
Australian Broadcasting Corporation original programming
Australian drama television series
English-language television shows
Fiction about invasions
Television shows set in Australia
Tomorrow series
Australian children's television series
Television series about teenagers